John Gwenogvryn Evans (20 March 1852 – 25 March 1930) was a Welsh palaeographic expert and literary translator.

Early life
Evans was born at Llanybydder in Carmarthenshire. He was apprenticed to a grocer, but returned to school, one of his teachers being William Thomas (Gwilym Marles). He studied theology and became a Unitarian minister, but gave up his pastorate because of ill-health.

Scholarly career
Evans subsequently began to take an interest in ancient Welsh manuscripts, and set up his own printing press in Pwllheli to create facsimiles of major Welsh medieval manuscripts, such as the books of Aneirin and Taliesin. In 1880 he moved to Oxford, where he spent most of the rest of his life. He had been a speaker of Welsh in Carmarthenshire until the age of 19, and only now did he learn English.  After the publication of the first volume in the Series of Old Welsh Texts in 1887, Evans was awarded the degree of MA honoris causa by the University of Oxford. In May 1901 he received the degree D.Litt honoris causa from the same university.

From 1894 to 1920, Evans was employed by the Historical Manuscripts Commission, producing a major Report on Manuscripts in the Welsh Language. In 1905 he facilitated the purchase of the Peniarth manuscript collection from Sir John Williams. Since 1909, this has been lodged in the National Library of Wales at Aberystwyth. He campaigned for a secure library for Wales. Valuable books were then in danger of destruction by fire, damp and vermin. His connection with Sir John Williams was important in the history of the establishment of the National Library.

In 1915 he completed the publication of a two volume set of the works of the 6th-century Welsh poet Taliesin. The first volume, the Facsimile & text of the Book of Taliesin, is a complete photographic facsimile of the original manuscript (c.1275–1325) with a scholarly introduction and notes. This was accompanied by Poems from the book of Taliesin, being his own seven-year scholarly translation with notes. The latter book included and translated the mystical poems, as well as the historical/legendary poems. The initial reception of his Taliesin work suffered on several counts: the books were issued during the First World War; and in 1918 the Taliesin work was badly criticised in the Welsh journal Y Cymmrodor, which thereafter damaged his standing in Wales.  Evans replied to his critic at length, taking up the complete 1924 issue of Y Cymmrodor with his "Taliesin: or The Critic Cricitised".

Later life and death
Evans retired to Llanbedrog in Caernarfonshire, where he ran his own printing press as a hobby. He and his wife Edith are both buried there.

References

Welsh Biography Online

External links

1852 births
1930 deaths
Welsh palaeographers
People associated with The National Archives (United Kingdom)
Welsh Unitarians